Aziza Shukry Hussein, also spelt as Aziza Shoukri Husayn, (30 May 1919 - 2015) was an Egyptian social welfare expert and leading advocate of family planning. She was active in Egypt's feminist movement. In 1962 Hussein became the first woman to represent Egypt at the United Nations and served on its Status of Women Commission for fifteen years.

She received her honorary degrees from the University of Maine and the American University in Cairo.

Personal life
Hussein was born in Zifta; her Egyptian father was a surgeon and her mother was of Turkish origin.

In 1947 she married the Egyptian diplomat Dr Ahmed Hussein.

She died in 2015.

Biography 
"A Pilgrim's Soul: Memoirs", by Aziza Shoukry Hussein.

References

1919 births
Egyptian people of Turkish descent
Egyptian women's rights activists
2015 deaths